Manju Bala Swami (born 1 July 1989) is an Indian track and field athlete competing in the hammer throw. She won the bronze medal in the event in the 2014 Asian Games in Incheon, South Korea.

Her bronze medal was briefly upgraded to silver after the original winner Zhang Wenxiu failed a doping test, but Zhang was later reinstated as the winner.

References

External links
 

1989 births
Living people
Athletes (track and field) at the 2010 Commonwealth Games
Athletes (track and field) at the 2022 Commonwealth Games
Athletes (track and field) at the 2014 Asian Games
Asian Games medalists in athletics (track and field)
Female hammer throwers
Commonwealth Games competitors for India
Indian female athletes
21st-century Indian women
21st-century Indian people
Sportswomen from Rajasthan
People from Churu district
Asian Games bronze medalists for India
Medalists at the 2014 Asian Games
Indian female hammer throwers
Athletes from Rajasthan